Indicus – Indian in Latin – may refer to:

Species disambiguation pages 
A. indicus (disambiguation)
B. indicus (disambiguation)
C. indicus (disambiguation)
D. indicus (disambiguation)
E. indicus (disambiguation)
F. indicus (disambiguation)
G. indicus (disambiguation)
H. indicus (disambiguation)
I. indicus (disambiguation)
L. indicus (disambiguation)
M. indicus (disambiguation)
N. indicus (disambiguation)
O. indicus (disambiguation)
P. indicus (disambiguation)
R. indicus (disambiguation)
S. indicus (disambiguation)
T. indicus (disambiguation)
V. indicus (disambiguation)

Other species 
 Janibacter indicus, a species of aerobic bacterium
 Kurtus indicus, a species of nurseryfish
 Urocolius indicus, the red-faced mousebird

See also
 Indicum (disambiguation)
 Indica (disambiguation)